Expert Opinion on Biological Therapy is a monthly peer-reviewed medical journal covering research on all aspects of biological therapy, including gene therapy and gene transfer technologies, therapeutic peptides and proteins, vaccines and antibodies, and cell- and tissue-based therapies. The journal is published by Taylor & Francis and the editor-in-chief is Michael Morse (Duke University Hospital). The journal was established in 2001 and according to the Journal Citation Reports, it has a 2017 impact factor of 3.974. The journal is also indexed in MEDLINE.

References

External links 
 

Monthly journals
Publications established in 2001
English-language journals
Pharmacology journals
Expert Opinion journals
Taylor & Francis academic journals
Regenerative medicine journals
Immunology journals